Morocco competed at the 2017 World Games held in Wrocław, Poland.

Medalists

Ju-jitsu 

Seif-Eddine Houmine won the gold medal in the men's ne-waza +94 kg event and the bronze medal in the men's ne-waza open event.

Karate 

Achraf Ouchen lost the bronze medal match in the men's kumite +84 kg event.

References 

Nations at the 2017 World Games
2017 in Moroccan sport
2017